Súchil is one of the 39 municipalities of Durango, in north-western Mexico. The municipal seat lies at Súchil.

As of 2010, the municipality had a total population of 6,761, down from 6,928 as of 2005.

As of 2010, the town of Súchil had a population of 4,107. Other than the town of Súchil, the municipality had 62 localities, none of which had a population over 1,000.

References

Municipalities of Durango